= Nang Pu =

Kachin human rights activist from Myanmar

Nang Pu (Burmese: နန်ပူ; born 20 October 1972) is a Kachin human rights activist and gender-rights advocate in Myanmar. She is the director of the Htoi Gender and Development Foundation and founder of the Kachin State Women's Network, organizations that support internally displaced women, survivors of sexual violence, and human trafficking victims in Kachin State.

== Early life and education ==
Nang Pu was born on 20 October 1972 in Myitkyina, Kachin State, to N Bauk Naw and Jar Bu. She graduated with a B.A. in English from Myitkyina University.

== Activism ==
As director of the Htoi Gender and Development Foundation and founder of the Kachin State Women's Network, Nang Pu has spoken out about the dangers faced by women in conflict areas. She drew attention to the use of rape as a weapon of war, pressed for justice in cases of sexual violence, and urged that women hold at least 30 percent of seats in peace negotiations, in accordance with United Nations Security Council Resolutions 1325 and 1820. She has also raised an alarm over human trafficking in IDP camps, particularly cross-border trafficking into China.

In 2018, Nang Pu participated in public protests in Myitkyina calling for safe evacuation and humanitarian access for displaced civilians trapped in conflict zones. Alongside fellow activists, she was charged under Myanmar's defamation laws for statements made during these actions. In Myitkyina, protests took place on public roads urging the authorities to release them. In December 2018, she was sentenced to six months in prison under Section 500 of the Penal Code and fined; the charges were related to defamation of the military. Her appeal partly succeeded: in early 2019, the Kachin State Court reduced her sentence by two months on health grounds; she ultimately served four months and was released in April 2019.

While imprisoned, Nang Pu was honored as one of three recipients of the Schuman Awards 2019, granted by the European Union in recognition of her contributions to peace, human rights, and gender equality. Her sister-in-law accepted the award on her behalf in February 2019. She also received the Kachin Human Rights Defender Award from the World Kachin Congress in February 2019. In March 2019, the Myitkyina News Journal presented her with its MNJ Award in recognition of her commitment to community service. The U.S. Embassy honored her as a recipient of its annual Women of Change award.

In 2019, she delivered a statement to the United Nations Human Rights Council in Geneva regarding women's rights violations in the conflict zones of Kachin State and Rakhine State.
